The 24th Mechanized Corps (Military Unit Number 7161) was a mechanized corps of the Red Army, active from spring 1941 to late 1941. On June 22, 1941, at the beginning of Operation Barbarossa, it was located at Proskurov in the Kiev Special Military District.

The corps commander was Maj. Gen. Vladimir Chistyakov. Its chief of staff was Colonel Alexander Danilov, who died in the Uman Pocket. The corps' three divisions were seemingly destroyed at Uman in August 1941.

Units

45th Tank Division (Military Unit Number 1703)
Commander - Brigade Commander, with 08/12/41, Major General Mikhail Solomatin. Deputy Head of the Political Department - Battalion Commissar Vinogradov Vakhrouchev.

89 Tank Regiment - a / h 1727 
90 Tank Regiment - a / h 1731 
45 motorized infantry regiment - a / h 1720 
45 Howitzer Artillery Regiment - a / h 1737 
Other units: (ozad - a / h 1717 pe - a / h 1705, ponb - a / h 1737 obs - a / h in 1709, the field hospital - a / h 1812 ATB - a / h 1802 HDR - a / h 1807 rreg - a / h 1713 groin - a / h 1824)

49th Tank Division  (Military Unit Number 9405) 
Commander - Colonel Konstantin Shvetsov. Artillery commander - Colonel Nicanor Nikanorovich Lyubimov (died in captivity)

97 Tank Regiment - a / h 9513 
98 Tank Regiment - a / h 9528 
49 motorized infantry regiment - a / h 9493 
49 Howitzer Artillery Regiment - a / h 9554 
other units (ozad - a / h 9483, pe - a / h 9421 ponb - a / h 9578, obs - a / h 9442, the field hospital - a / h 9606, ATB - a / h 9586, HDR - a / h 9597, rreg - a / h 9461, groin - a / h 9622)

216th Motorized Division (Military Unit Number 9250) 
Commander - Colonel Ashot Sargsyan Sarkisovich. Head of engineering department - Ivan Lebedev.

647 motorized infantry regiment - a / h 9262 
665 motorized infantry regiment - a / h 9273 
134 Tank Regiment - a / h 9282 
656 Artillery Regiment - a / h 9276 
42 separate antitank battalion - a / h 9319 
215 separate anti-aircraft artillery battalion - a / h 9306 
290 Reconnaissance Battalion - a / h 9291 
370 easy-to- engineer battalion - a / h 9302 
590 separate communications battalion - a / h 9297 
214 artillery park division - a / h 9348 
356 medical and sanitary battalion - a / h 9324 
685 Motor Transport Battalion - a / h 9357 
160 repair and refurbishment battalion - a / h 9342 
34 company regulation - a / h 9365 
460 Field Bakery - a / h 9329 
725 Field postal station 
586 Field ticket office of the State Bank

Corps troops
17 Motorcycle Regiment - a / h 7145 
551 separate communications battalion - a / h 7372 
81 separate motoinzhenerny battalion - a / h 7431 
124 separate Corps Air Squadron - a / h 5601

References

Mechanized corps of the Soviet Union
Military units and formations established in 1941
Military units and formations disestablished in 1941